The 2mm Kolibri (also known as the 2.7mm Kolibri Car Pistol or 2.7×9mm Kolibri) was the smallest commercially available centerfire cartridge, patented in 1910 and introduced in 1914 by Franz Pfannl, an Austrian watchmaker, with financial support from Georg Grabner.  It was designed to accompany the Kolibri semi-auto pistol or single-shot pistol, both marketed as self-defense weapons.

The name is derived from Kolibri, the German word for hummingbird, which is among the smallest of birds.

Background 

The cartridge weighs 5.3 grams (82 grains), measures 3.6 millimeters (0.14 in) at its widest point, and 11 mm (0.43 in) from the base of the primer to the tip of the bullet. The cartridge is headspaced on the mouth of the case. For perspective, an average person's punch measures 10-15 joules, meaning that the round has less energy than a punch.

The round was not well accepted.  The 2mm Kolibri's small size makes handling and loading individual cartridges difficult, and the bullet itself is fairly weak, with literature at the time suggesting the round was capable of penetrating only  of pine board.  The round also suffers some accuracy issues, since the technology of the time was incapable of applying rifling to the bore of such a small caliber, resulting in no spin on the bullet.

Due to the weakness and inaccuracy of the firearm, the 2mm Kolibri was advertised as a ladies' self-defence weapon that was small enough to fit inside a handbag.  While probably not effective against a mugger if shot at the chest or limbs, it could potentially inflict some damage if shot at the attacker's face.  It was discontinued in 1914 with the outbreak of the war.

The 2mm gun was replaced by 3mm and 4mm weapons in the series, which was discontinued in 1938.

As with the related firearm series, this gun is now a collector's item with about 1000 ever produced. It is notable for firing the smallest centerfire cartridge ever produced.

In popular culture 
The Kolibri was featured in the World War I FPS game Battlefield 1 as a weapon available for the Scout Class.

See also

 List of handgun cartridges
 2 mm caliber
 Table of handgun and rifle cartridges

References

External links
 Original Austrian Patent No. 45314 

Pistol and rifle cartridges
Semi-automatic pistols